Franz Ritter von Liszt may refer to:

Franz Liszt (1811–1886), Hungarian composer and pianist
Franz von Liszt (1851–1919), German jurist, criminologist and international law reformer